"Movement" is a song by American rock band LCD Soundsystem. It was released as a single on 8 November 2004 through DFA Records and appeared on their eponymous debut studio album, released in 2005.

Background
Band frontman James Murphy has described the impetus of the song:
 The song stylistically pays tribute to The Fall, who Murphy has cited as a significant influence, and interpolates a lyric from that band's track "Telephone Thing".

Track listing
 DFA — dfaemi 2141 — 7" vinyl and CD single

Charts

References

LCD Soundsystem songs
2004 singles
2004 songs
Songs written by James Murphy (electronic musician)